Elachista longispina is a moth of the family Elachistidae that is endemic to Kenya.

The wingspan is about 8.6 mm. The forewings are dark brownish grey with denser brownish-black scales forming an irregular patch in the basal lower corner of the wing and a spot on the fold. The fringe is brownish grey. The hindwings are dark brownish grey, with a slightly paler fringe.

Etymology
The species name refers to the long, spinose cornuti present in the male phallus and is derived from Latin longus (meaning long) and spina (meaning spine).

References

longispina
Moths described in 2009
Endemic moths of Kenya
Moths of Africa